The chancellor of Germany, officially the federal chancellor of the Federal Republic of Germany, is the head of the federal government of Germany and the commander in chief of the German Armed Forces during wartime. The chancellor is the chief executive of the Federal Cabinet and heads the executive branch. The chancellor is elected by the Bundestag on the proposal of the federal president and without debate (Article 63 of the German Constitution).

The current officeholder is Olaf Scholz of the SPD, who was elected in December 2021, succeeding Angela Merkel. He was elected after the SPD entered into a coalition agreement with Alliance 90/The Greens and the FDP.

History of the office

The office of Chancellor has a long history, stemming back to the Holy Roman Empire, when the office of German archchancellor was usually held by archbishops of Mainz. The title was, at times, used in several states of German-speaking Europe. The modern office of chancellor was established with the North German Confederation, of which Otto von Bismarck became Bundeskanzler (meaning "Federal Chancellor") in 1867. With the enlargement of this federal state to the German Empire in 1871, the title was renamed to Reichskanzler (meaning "Imperial Chancellor"). With Germany's constitution of 1949, the title of Bundeskanzler was revived.

The role of the chancellor has varied during the different eras. From 1867 to 1918, the chancellor was the only responsible minister at the federal level. He was appointed by the Bundespräsidium, (i.e. the Prussian king; since 1871 called Emperor). The state secretaries (Staatssekretäre) were civil servants subordinate to the chancellor and similar to ministers. Besides his executive duties, the constitution gave the chancellor only one function: presiding over the Bundesrat (Federal Council), the representative organ of the states (which together with the Reichstag was the Reich's lawmaking body). The chancellor was also nearly always minister president of Prussia. Indirectly, this gave him the power of the Bundesrat, including to dissolve parliament.

Although effective government was possible only in cooperation with the Reichstag, the results of the elections had at most an indirect influence on the chancellorship. Only in October 1918 was the constitution changed to require that the chancellor have the trust of parliament. Some two weeks later, Chancellor Max von Baden declared the abdication of the emperor and, although he lacked the constitutional authority, handed over his office to Friedrich Ebert of the revolutionary Council of the People's Deputies.

According to the Weimar Constitution of 1919, the chancellor was head of a collegial government. The chancellor was appointed by the Reich president, as were the ministers, on the chancellor's recommendation. The chancellor or any minister had to be dismissed if the Reichstag demanded it. As today, the chancellor had the prerogative to determine the guidelines of government. In reality this power was limited by the needs of coalition governments and the powers of the Reich president.

When the Nazis came to power on 30 January 1933, the Weimar Constitution was de facto set aside. After the death of President Hindenburg in 1934, Adolf Hitler, the dictatorial party leader and chancellor, took over the powers of the president. The new official title became Führer und Reichskanzler (meaning "Leader and Imperial Chancellor").

The 1949 constitution gave the chancellor much greater powers than during the Weimar Republic, while strongly diminishing the role of the president. Germany is today often referred to as a "chancellor democracy", reflecting the role of the chancellor as the country's chief executive.

Since 1867, 33 individuals have served as heads of government of Germany, West Germany, or Northern Germany, nearly all of them with the title of Chancellor.

Due to his administrative tasks, the head of the clerics at the chapel of an imperial palace during the Carolingian Empire was called chancellor (from ). The chapel's college acted as the Emperor's chancery issuing deeds and capitularies. From the days of Louis the German, the archbishop of Mainz was ex officio German archchancellor, a position he held until the end of the Holy Roman Empire in 1806, while de jure the archbishop of Cologne was chancellor of Italy and the archbishop of Trier of Burgundy. These three prince-archbishops were also prince-electors of the empire electing the King of the Romans. Already in medieval times, the German chancellor had political power like Archbishop Willigis (archchancellor 975–1011, regent for King Otto III of Germany 991–994) or Rainald von Dassel (Chancellor 1156–1162 and 1166–1167) under Emperor Frederick Barbarossa.

In 1559, Emperor Ferdinand I established the agency of an imperial chancellery (Reichshofkanzlei) at the Vienna Hofburg Palace, headed by a vice chancellor under the nominal authority of the Mainz archbishop. Upon the 1620 Battle of White Mountain, Emperor Ferdinand II created the office of an Austrian court chancellor in charge of the internal and foreign affairs of the Habsburg monarchy. From 1753 onwards, the office of an Austrian state chancellor was held by Prince Kaunitz. The imperial chancellery lost its importance, and from the days of Maria Theresa and Joseph II, merely existed on paper. After the dissolution of the Holy Roman Empire, Prince Metternich served as state chancellor of the Austrian Empire (1821–1848), likewise Prince Hardenberg acted as Prussian chancellor (1810–1822). The German Confederation of 1815–1866 did not have a government or parliament, only the Bundestag as representative organ of the states.

In the now-defunct German Democratic Republic (GDR, East Germany), which existed from 7 October 1949 to 3 October 1990 (when the territory of the former GDR was reunified with the Federal Republic of Germany), the position of chancellor did not exist. The equivalent position of head of government was called either Minister President (Ministerpräsident) or Chairman of the Council of Ministers of the GDR (Vorsitzender des Ministerrats der DDR), which was the second powerful position under General Secretary of the Socialist Unity Party of Germany (See Leaders of East Germany).

Federal Chancellor of the North German Confederation (1867–1870) 
The head of the federal government of the North German Confederation, which was created on 1 July 1867, had the title Bundeskanzler. The only person to hold the office was Otto von Bismarck, the minister president of Prussia. The king, as holder of the Bundespräsidium, appointed him on 14 July.

Under the constitution of 1 January 1871, the king had the additional title of Emperor. The constitution still called the chancellor Bundeskanzler. This was changed in the new constitution of 16 April 1871 to Reichskanzler. Since the office remained the same, it was not necessary for Bismarck to be re-appointed.

Chancellor of the German Reich

Under the Emperor (1871–1918)
In the 1871 German Empire, the Reichskanzler ("Imperial Chancellor") served both as the emperor's first minister and as presiding officer of the Bundesrat, the upper chamber of the German parliament. He was neither elected by nor responsible to Parliament (the Reichstag). Instead, the chancellor was appointed by the emperor.

The federal level had four organs:
 the king of Prussia in his federal constitutional role as bearer of the Bundespräsidium, since 1871 with the title of emperor
 the federal council (Bundesrat), consisting of representatives of the federal states and presided over by the chancellor
 the parliament, called der Reichstag
 the federal executive, first led by Otto von Bismarck, the Minister President of Prussia, as chancellor.

Technically, the foreign ministers of the empire's states instructed their states' deputies to the Bundesrat and therefore outranked the chancellor. For this reason, Prince Bismarck (as he was from 1871 onwards) continued to serve as both minister president and foreign minister of Prussia for virtually his entire tenure as chancellor of the empire, since he wanted to continue to exercise the power. Because Prussia controlled seventeen votes in the Bundesrat, Bismarck could effectively control the proceedings by making deals with the smaller states.

The term chancellor signalled the seemingly low priority of this institution compared to the governments of the German states, because the new chancellor of the federal empire should not be a full-fledged prime minister, in contrast to the heads of the states. The title of chancellor additionally symbolized a strong monarchist, bureaucratic, and ultimately antiparliamentary component, as in the Prussian tradition of, for instance, Hardenberg.

In both of these aspects, the executive of the federation, and then empire, as it was formed in 1867 and 1871, was deliberately different from the Imperial Ministry of the revolutionary years 1848–49, which had been led by a prime minister elected by the National Assembly.

In 1871, the concept of the federal chancellor was transferred to the executive of the newly formed German Empire, which now also contained the South German states. Here too, the terms of “chancellor” and "federal agency" (as opposed to "ministry" or "government") suggested an (apparent) lower priority of the federal executive as compared to the governments of the federal states. For this reason, neither the chancellor nor the leaders of the imperial departments under his command used the title of Minister until 1918.

The constitution of Germany was altered on 29 October 1918, when the parliament was given the right to dismiss the chancellor. However, the change could not prevent the outbreak of a revolution a few days later.

Revolutionary period (1918–1919)
On 9 November 1918, Chancellor Max von Baden handed over his office of chancellor to Friedrich Ebert. Ebert continued to serve as head of government during the three months between the end of the German Empire in November 1918 and the first gathering of the Weimar National Assembly in February 1919, but did not use the title of chancellor.

During that time, Ebert also served as chairman of the "Council of the People's Deputies", until 29 December 1918 together with the Independent Social Democrat Hugo Haase.

Weimar Republic (1919–1933)

The office of chancellor was continued in the Weimar Republic. The Weimar Constitution provided for a two-part executive consisting of a Reich president and a government made up of Reich ministers and a Reich chancellor (Article 52) who determined the guidelines of the government's policy (Article 56).

The constitution stipulated that the president appoint and dismiss the chancellor and ministers. The ministers were appointed by the president on the recommendation of the chancellor (Article 53), and members of the government required the confidence of the Reichstag (Article 54). The provisions gave rise to the question of who in fact was responsible for forming the government.

Constitutional law expert Ernst Rudolf Huber said that the constitution had tacitly assumed that the president would have discussions with party leaders in the Reichstag before he made ministerial appointments. Based on these talks, the  president would get a sense of which potential chancellor would be able to build a stable majority in the Reichstag. According to the sense of the Weimar Constitution, the president was thus to have the initiative. The task of putting together the Reich government was nevertheless the responsibility of the chancellor. The president could not appoint anyone as minister whom the chancellor had not proposed.

The chancellor alone had to answer to the Reichstag and the  president for the policy guidelines, and he determined whether the conduct of business by the individual Reich ministries conformed to the guidelines. The government's decisions required a majority vote of the ministers, who sitting together were known as the National Ministry (Article 58). The chancellor could therefore be outvoted, as could a department minister. The chancellor presided over the government, and he had to conduct business in accordance with given rules of procedure.

In practice the Reich chancellor's power to determine political guidelines was limited by his own party as well as the other parties in the governing coalition. The Weimar chancellors were accordingly men whose strength lay in mediation rather than political initiative. Constitutionally, there was also the fact that the president had certain special rights. The actions of the president required the countersignature of the chancellor or the minister or ministers concerned, but the president always had to be informed about matters of foreign and defense policy.

The Reichstag could call for the dismissal of any member of the government, including the chancellor. Under Articles 54 and 59, the Reichstag could also impeach the chancellor as well as the ministers and the president before the State Court for the German Reich, the Weimar Republic's constitutional court.

Nazi Germany (1933–1945)

Adolf Hitler was appointed chancellor of Germany on 30 January 1933 by Paul von Hindenburg. On taking office, Hitler immediately began accumulating power and changing the nature of the chancellorship. After only two months in office, and following the burning of the Reichstag building, the parliament passed the Enabling Act giving the chancellor full legislative powers for a period of four years – the chancellor could introduce any law without consulting Parliament. The powers of the chancellor continued to grow until August 1934, when the incumbent President Paul von Hindenburg died. Hitler used the Enabling Act to merge the office of chancellor with that of the president to create a new office, "the leader" (or Führer).

Although the offices were merged, Hitler continued to be addressed as "Führer und Reichskanzler" indicating that the head of state and head of government were still separate positions, albeit held by the same person, although the title of "Reichskanzler" was quietly dropped. This separation was made more evident when, in April 1945, Hitler gave instruction that upon his death, the office of the Führer would dissolve and be replaced by the previous system of administration: that of the office of the President separate from that of Chancellor. On 30 April 1945, when Hitler committed suicide, he was briefly succeeded as Chancellor by Joseph Goebbels and as President of Germany by Grand Admiral Karl Dönitz. When Goebbels also committed suicide, Dönitz appointed Count Schwerin von Krosigk as head of government with the title "Leading Minister".

Federal Chancellor of the Federal Republic of Germany (1949–present) 

The 1949 German constitution, the Basic Law (Grundgesetz), invests the chancellor (German, Bundeskanzler) with broad powers to initiate government policy. For that reason, some observers refer to the German political system as a "chancellor democracy". Even though the office of chancellor is often considered the most powerful in the German political system and is seen as such within the German public, it is only the third highest office, following the head of state, the President of Germany, and the President of the Bundestag, a position similar to the speaker of the federal parliament.

Whichever major party (CDU/CSU or SPD) does not hold the chancellorship usually calls its leading candidate for the federal election "chancellor-candidate" (Kanzlerkandidat). The federal government (Bundesregierung) consists of the chancellor and cabinet ministers.

Role 
The chancellor's authority emanates from the provisions of the Basic Law and in practice from their status as leader of the party (or coalition of parties) holding a majority of seats in the Bundestag (federal parliament). With the exception of Helmut Schmidt and Olaf Scholz, the chancellor has also been chairman of their own party. This was the case with Chancellor Gerhard Schröder from 1999 until he resigned the chairmanship of the SPD in 2004.

The first chancellor, Konrad Adenauer, set many precedents that continue today and established the chancellorship as the clear focus of power in Germany. Under the provisions of the Basic Law giving him the power to set guidelines for all fields of policy, Adenauer arrogated nearly all major decisions to himself. He often treated his ministers as mere extensions of his authority rather than colleagues. While his successors have tended to be less domineering, the chancellor has acquired enough ex officio authority (in addition to his/her constitutional powers) that Germany is often described by constitutional law experts as a "chancellor democracy".

The chancellor determines the composition of the Federal Cabinet. The president formally appoints and dismisses cabinet ministers, on the recommendation of the chancellor; no parliamentary approval is needed. According to the Basic Law, the chancellor may set the number of cabinet ministers and dictate their specific duties. Chancellor Ludwig Erhard had the largest cabinet, with 22 ministers, in the mid-1960s. Helmut Kohl presided over 17 ministers at the start of his fourth term in 1994; the 2002 cabinet, the second of Chancellor Gerhard Schröder, had 13 ministers, and the Angela Merkel cabinet as of 22 November 2005 had 15.

Article 65 of the Basic Law sets forth three principles that define how the executive branch functions:
The "chancellor principle" makes the chancellor responsible for all government policies; this is also known as the Richtlinienkompetenz (roughly translated as "guideline setting competence"). Any formal policy guidelines issued by the chancellor are legally binding directives that cabinet ministers must implement. Cabinet ministers are expected to introduce specific policies at the ministerial level that reflect the chancellor's broader guidelines.
The "principle of ministerial autonomy" entrusts each minister with the freedom to supervise departmental operations and prepare legislative proposals without cabinet interference so long as the minister's policies are consistent with the chancellor's broader guidelines.
The "cabinet principle" calls for disagreements between federal ministers over jurisdictional or budgetary matters to be settled by the cabinet.

List of chancellors (1949–present) 

Political party:

Election mechanism 
The chancellor is elected by the Bundestag and formally appointed by the president of Germany. A chancellor's election is necessary whenever the office of Chancellor has fallen vacant. This is the case if a newly elected Bundestag meets for the first time, or if the chancellor dies or resigns.

The chancellor's election (in the first two voting phases) is one of the few cases in which a vote in the Bundestag requires a majority of all elected members, not just a majority of those assembled at the time, or the so-called Kanzlermehrheit ("chancellor majority"). As with other elections performed by the Bundestag, the chancellor is elected via secret ballot. The process begins with the President of Germany proposing a candidate to the Bundestag (A formality, as they are usually a candidate on which majority parties have agreed to beforehand), who is then voted upon without debate ("1st voting phase"). If this nominee is not elected, the parliamentary groups in the Bundestag may, during the following 14 days, propose their own nominees, who also have to be elected with the "chancellor-majority" ("2nd voting phase"). If no chancellor has been elected within this period, the Bundestag will hold one last ballot on the 15th day after the first ballot, to which (like in the 2nd voting phase) the parliamentary groups may put forward candidates ("3rd voting phase"): If any candidate reaches the "chancellor majority", the President of Germany is obliged to appoint them. If not, the president may either appoint as chancellor the candidate who received a plurality of votes (de facto allowing formation of a minority government) or call new elections for the Bundestag within 60 days.

Another possibility to vote a new chancellor into office is the constructive vote of no confidence, which allows the Bundestag to replace a sitting chancellor, if it elects a new chancellor with the "chancellor-majority" (see below).

As of 2021, all chancellors of the federal republic have been (re-)elected on proposal of the President and on the first ballot with the sole exception of Helmut Kohl, who was elected to his first term via a constructive vote of no confidence against Helmut Schmidt.

Confidence 

Unlike in other parliamentary legislatures, the Bundestag cannot remove the chancellor with a traditional motion of no confidence. Instead, the removal of a chancellor is only possible if a majority of the Bundestag members agree on a successor, who is then immediately sworn in as new chancellor. This procedure is called "constructive motion of no confidence" (konstruktives Misstrauensvotum) and was created to avoid the situation that existed in the Weimar Republic, when it was easier to gather a parliament majority willing to remove a government in office than to find a majority capable of supporting a new stable government.

In order to garner legislative support in the Bundestag, the chancellor can also ask for a motion of confidence (Vertrauensfrage, literally "question of trust"), either combined with a legislative proposal or as a standalone vote. If such a vote fails, the chancellor may ask the president for the dissolution of the Bundestag.

Vice chancellor 

The chancellor must appoint one of the cabinet ministers as vice chancellor (Article 69.1 Basic Law). The vice chancellor may deputise for the chancellor, if they are absent or unable to perform their duties. Although the chancellor is theoretically free to choose any cabinet minister, in coalition governments the leadership of the second biggest coalition party usually designates one of their ministers for the position, whom the chancellor appoints accordingly.

If the chancellor's term in office ends or if they resign, the Bundestag has to elect a new chancellor. The president of Germany may ask the former chancellor to act as chancellor until a new office holder is elected, but if they are unwilling or unable to do so, the president may also appoint the vice chancellor as acting chancellor. This has happened once: On 7 May 1974 Chancellor Willy Brandt resigned as a consequence of the Guillaume affair, an espionage scandal. In his letter of resignation to President Gustav Heinemann he requested, to be not asked to remain in office in an acting capacity and instead to appoint the vice chancellor as acting chancellor. President Heinemann followed the request. Vice Chancellor Walter Scheel was appointed acting chancellor and served for nine days until the election of Helmut Schmidt on 16 May 1974.

Scheel not taken into account, three persons, Ludwig Erhard, Willy Brandt and Olaf Scholz, have held both the office of Vice Chancellor and that of Chancellor of Germany.

The current vice chancellor of Germany is Robert Habeck, who also serves as Minister for Economic Affairs and Climate Protection in the Scholz cabinet.

List of vice chancellors (1949–present)

Official residence 
Since 2001, the official seat of the chancellor is the Federal Chancellery in Berlin (Bundeskanzleramt). The former seat of the Federal Chancellery, the Palais Schaumburg in the former capital Bonn, now serves as a secondary official seat. The chancellor's country retreat is Schloss Meseberg in the state of Brandenburg.

The private lodging of the chancellors at Bonn has previously been the Chancellor's bungalow built by Ludwig Erhard in the park of Palais Schaumburg, while his predecessor Konrad Adenauer used to live in his private house near Bonn. Under Adenauer, the government had also acquired a villa in Dahlem in 1962, a suburban district of southwestern Berlin, as a pied-a-terre of the chancellors in West-Berlin. Gerhard Schröder lived there between 1999 and 2001. Since 2004 it has however served as a private residence for the Presidents of Germany. Angela Merkel preferred to live with her husband in her private apartment downtown.

Style of address 
The correct style of address in German is Herr Bundeskanzler (male) or Frau Bundeskanzlerin (female). In international correspondence, the chancellor is referred to as "His/Her Excellency the Chancellor of the Federal Republic of Germany" ("Seine/Ihre Exzellenz der Bundeskanzler/die Bundeskanzlerin der Bundesrepublik Deutschland").

Salary 
Holding the third-highest state office available within Germany, the chancellor of Germany receives €220,000 per annum and a €22,000 bonus, i.e. one and two thirds of Salary Grade B11 (according to § 11 (1) a of the Federal Law on MinistersBundesministergesetz, BGBl. 1971 I p. 1166 and attachment IV to the Federal Law on Salaries of OfficersBundesbesoldungsgesetz, BGBl. 2002 I p. 3020)

See also 

 List of chancellors of Germany
 List of chancellors of Germany by time in office
 Religious affiliations of chancellors of Germany
 Leadership of East Germany
 Prime minister

Notes

References

Further reading

Books 
 Klein, Herbert, ed. 1993. The German Chancellors. Berlin: Edition.
 Padgett, Stephen, ed. 1994. The Development of the German Chancellorship: Adenauer to Kohl. London: Hurst.

Articles 
 Harlen, Christine M. 2002. "The Leadership Styles of the German Chancellors: From Schmidt to Schröder". Politics and Policy 30 (2 (June)): 347–371.
 Helms, Ludger. 2001. "The Changing Chancellorship: Resources and Constraints Revisited". German Politics 10 (2): 155–168.
 Mayntz, Renate. 1980. "Executive Leadership in Germany: Dispersion of Power or 'Kanzler Demokratie'?" In presidents and Prime Ministers, ed. R. Rose and E. N. Suleiman. Washington, D.C.: American Enterprise Institute. pp. 139–171.
 Smith, Gordon. 1991. "The Resources of a German Chancellor". West European Politics 14 (2): 48–61.

External links 
 
 

1867 establishments in Germany
1949 establishments in Germany
 
Germany, Chancellor